Drochtersen is a municipality in the district Stade, in Lower Saxony (Germany). It is located 45 km Northwest of Hamburg.

It belonged to the Prince-Archbishopric of Bremen. In 1648 the Prince-Archbishopric was transformed into the Duchy of Bremen, which was first ruled in personal union by the Swedish and from 1715 on by the Hanoverian Crown. In 1823 the Duchy was abolished and its territory became part of the Stade Region.

Notable places
The Drochtersen Shot Tower is a 42 meter high shot tower owned by the Haentler & Natermann Jagd-Schrot & Hagel-Fabrik (Hunt pellet and hail fabrication) factory for the production of shot balls at the Elbe. This tower is no longer in use.

References

Stade (district)